Kassari is a village in Hiiumaa Parish, Hiiu County in northwestern Estonia, on Kassari Island.

Historically, the village was part of Kassari Manor. In 1920s the manor was changed to Kassari settlement. Kassari got its village status in about 1939. In 1977, the Uusküla village was merged into Kassari village.

References
 

Villages in Hiiu County